The Pomerado Conglomerate Formation is a geologic formation in southwestern San Diego County, California.

It was named for exposures located along Pomerado Road, at the divide between Carroll Canyon and Poway Valley.

Geology
The Pomerado Conglomerate is of the Late Eocene Epoch, and is a massive cobble conglomerate. It is lithologically identical to the local Stadium Conglomerate.

It overlies the sandstone Mission Valley Formation.

Fossil content

The Pomerado Conglomerate preserves fossils dating back to the Late Eocene Epoch of the Paleogene period, during the Cenozoic Era.

Mammals

Ferae

Rodents

See also

 
 
 List of fossiliferous stratigraphic units in California
 Paleontology in California

References

Further reading
 

Paleogene California
Eocene Series of North America
Conglomerate formations
Geology of San Diego County, California
Geologic formations of California
Paleontology in California